Henry Warren Montgomery (June 16, 1858 – March 8, 1917) was a member of the South Dakota House of Representatives from 1903 to 1906.

Montgomery was born in Columbia County, Wisconsin and lived in Alexandria, South Dakota. He married Caroline Douglas (1860–1917), and they had seven children. He was a Democrat. He died on March 8, 1917.

References

People from Hanson County, South Dakota
People from Columbia County, Wisconsin
Democratic Party members of the South Dakota House of Representatives
1858 births
1917 deaths
19th-century American politicians